Princess Cantacuzene may refer to:
Princess Elsa Cantacuzene (née Elsa Bruckmann)
Julia Dent Cantacuzène Spiransky-Grant (1876–1975), married to Prince Mikhail Cantacuzène
Princess Kassandra Cantacuzene, mother of Antiochus Kantemir
Princess Irina Cantacuzene (1895–1945) and Princess Olga Cantacuzene (1899–1983), granddaughters of Catherine Chislova
Princess Marie Cantacuzène (1820–1898), Romanian model and wife of Pierre Puvis de Chavannes

See also:
Cantacuzino family of Wallachia